Lotte Grigel (born 5 April 1991) is a Danish handball player for Nantes Loire Atlantique Handball and the Danish national team.

She made her debut on the Danish national team on 14 October 2008, against Russia.

On 1 February 2019, it was announced that Lotte Grigel had signed a 2-year contract with Nantes Atlantique Handball.

Achievements

Domestic
 Damehåndboldligaen:
 Silver Medalist: 2015
 Danish Cup:
 Finalist: 2011
 Danish Super Cup:
 Winner: 2015
 Russian Super League:
 Winner: 2017
 Silver Medalist: 2016
 Russian Cup:
 Winner: 2016, 2017

European
 Women's EHF Cup:
 Winner: 2017
 Silver Medalist: 2014

References

External links

1991 births
Living people
Danish female handball players
People from Esbjerg
Expatriate handball players
Danish expatriate sportspeople in France
Danish expatriate sportspeople in Hungary
Danish expatriate sportspeople in Russia
Sportspeople from the Region of Southern Denmark